Sacro may refer to :

 Sacro - a Scottish voluntary organisation, 'Safeguarding Communities, Reducing Offending', formerly known as the Scottish Association for the Care and Resettlement of Offenders
 In combination with other words, the sacrum (e.g. sacroiliac)
The Sacro Convento, a Franciscan friary in Assisi, Umbria, Italy
Monte Sacro, a hill in Rome on the banks of the river Aniene
Sacromonte, a neighbourhood of Granada, Spain
Sacro Vergente, an Apostolic Letter of Pope Pius XII to all people of Russia
Cuore Sacro, a 2005 Italian-language film directed by Ferzan Ozpetek
Sacro Culto, the second album by Opera IX